The symbolic meaning of the dome has developed over millennia. Although the precise origins are unknown, a mortuary tradition of domes existed across the ancient world, as well as a symbolic association with the sky. Both of these traditions may have a common root in the use of the domed hut, a shape which was translated into tombs and associated with the heavens.

The mortuary tradition has been expressed in domed mausolea, martyria, and baptisteries. The celestial symbolism was adopted by rulers in the Middle East to emphasize their divine legitimacy and was inherited by later civilizations down to the present day as a general symbol of governmental authority.

Origins
The meaning of the dome has been extensively analyzed by architectural historians. According to Nicola Camerlenghi, it may not be possible to arrive at a single "fixed meaning and universal significance" for domes across all building types and locations throughout history, since the shape, function, and context for individual buildings were determined locally, even if inspired by distant predecessors, and meaning could change over time.

Mortuary tradition
According to E. Baldwin Smith, from the late Stone Age the dome-shaped tomb was used as a reproduction of the ancestral, god-given shelter made permanent as a venerated home of the dead. The instinctive desire to do this resulted in widespread domical mortuary traditions across the ancient world, from the stupas of India to the tholos tombs of Iberia. The Scythians built such domed tombs, as did some Germanic tribes in a paraboloid shape. By Hellenistic and Roman times, the domical tholos had become the customary cemetery symbol. Lukas Nickel writes that the conception of a round heaven over a square earth may have contributed to the Han Chinese' rapid adoption in the first century AD of square base cloister vault chambers in their tomb architecture.

Celestial tradition
Smith writes that in the process of transforming the hut shape from its original pliable materials into more difficult stone construction, the dome had also become associated with celestial and cosmic significance, as evident from decoration such as stars and celestial chariots on the ceilings of domed tombs. This cosmological thinking was not limited to domed ceilings, being part of a symbolic association between any house, tomb, or sanctuary and the universe as a whole, but it popularized the use of the domical shape. Michele Melaragno writes that the nomadic tribes of central Asia are the origin of a symbolic tradition of round domed-tents being associated with the sky and heavens that eventually spread to the Middle East and the Mediterranean. Rudolf Wittkower writes that a "cosmic interpretation of the dome remained common well into the eighteenth century."

Divine ruler

Herbert Howe writes that throughout the Middle East domes were symbolic of "the tent of the ruler, and especially of the god who dwells in the tent of the heavens." Passages in the Old Testament and intertestamental literature document this, such as Psalms 123:1, Isaiah 40:22, I Kings 8:30, Isaiah 66:1, Psalms 19:4, and Job 22:14. Domes and tent-canopies were also associated with the heavens in Ancient Persia and the Hellenistic-Roman world. A dome over a square base reflected the geometric symbolism of those shapes. The circle represented perfection, eternity, and the heavens. The square represented the earth. An octagon was intermediate between the two. 

According to Michael Walter, a tradition of the "golden dome" identifying the ruler with the cosmos, sun, and astrological values originated in Persia and spread to later Roman and Turkic courts. Persian kings used domed tents in their official audiences to symbolize their divinity, and this practice was adopted by Alexander the Great. According to Smith, the distinct symbolism of the heavenly or cosmic tent stemming from the royal audience tents of Achaemenid and Indian rulers was adopted by Roman rulers in imitation of Alexander, becoming the imperial baldachin. This probably began with Nero, whose Domus Aurea, meaning "Golden House", also made the dome a feature of Roman palace architecture. One way the Romans depicted the celestial tent in architecture was as a corrugated or gored dome.

Michele Melaragno writes that the allegory of Alexander the Great's domical tent in Roman imperial architecture coincided with the "divinification" of Roman emperors and served as a symbol of this. According to Nicholas Temple, Nero's octagonal domed room in his Domus Aurea was an early example of an imperial reception hall, the symbolism of which "signaled an elevation of the status of the emperor as living deity, which in the case of Nero related specifically to his incarnation as Helios and the Persian Mithra." The semi-domed apse became a symbol of Roman imperial authority under Domitian and depictions into the Byzantine period used overhead domes or semidomes to identify emperors. Karl Swoboda writes that even by the time of Diocletian, the dome probably symbolized sovereignty over the whole world. Roman imperial reception halls or throne rooms were often domed with circular or octagonal plans and, according to Nicholas Temple, "functioned as a ceremonial space between the emperor, his court and the gods", becoming a common feature of imperial palaces from the time of Constantine onwards.

Christianity
E. Baldwin Smith writes that, by the Christian era, "cosmic imagery had come to transcend the mortuary, divine and royal symbolism already associated with the dome" but the Christian use of domes acknowledged earlier symbolic associations. Thomas Mathews writes that Christianity's rejection of astrology was reflected in the omission of signs of the zodiac imagery from their dome decoration. According to Gillian MacKie, early Christian domes were often decorated at the base with imagery of the Four Evangelists, symbolizing "the idea that the microcosmic vision of heaven was supported by the word of God as revealed in the Gospels." 

According to Susan Balderstone, domed centralized plans, whether octagonal, circular, or tetraconch, were "associated with the influence of Arianism in the fourth century and with the Monophysites in the fifth century." Robert Stalley writes that baptisteries, mausolea, and martyria shared similar forms in the Roman architectural tradition as domed centralized plans due to representing the linked ideas of "death, burial, resurrection, and salvation".

Martyria
The dual sepulchral and heavenly symbolism was adopted by early Christians in both the use of domes in architecture and in the ciborium, a domical canopy like the baldachin used as a ritual covering for relics or the church altar. The traditional mortuary symbolism led the dome to be used in Christian central-type martyria in the Syrian area, the growing popularity of which spread the form. The spread and popularity of the cult of relics also transformed the domed central-type martyria into the domed churches of mainstream Christianity. The use of centralized buildings for the burials of heroes was common by the time the Anastasis Rotunda was built in Jerusalem, but the use of centralized domed buildings to symbolize resurrection was a Christian innovation. Richard Krautheimer notes that the octagonal pattern of Roman mausolea corresponded to the Christian idea of the number eight symbolizing spiritual regeneration.

Baptisteries
In Italy in the 4th century, baptisteries began to be built like domed mausolea and martyria, which spread in the 5th century. Smith writes that this reinforced the theological emphasis on baptism as a re-experience of the death and resurrection of Jesus Christ. Krautheimer writes that "baptism is the death of the old Adam and the resurrection of the new man; eight is the symbolic number of regeneration, salvation, and resurrection, as the world started the eighth day after creation began, and Christ rose from the dead on the eighth day of the Passion." Octagonal baptisteries originated in Milan, Rome, and Ravenna and were typical for the western empire, but rare in the eastern empire. Theresa Grupico states that the octagon, which is transitional between the circle and the square, came to represent Jesus' resurrection in early Christianity and was used in the ground plans of martyria and baptisteries for that reason. The domes themselves were sometimes octagonal, rather than circular. Nicholas Temple proposes the imperial reception hall as an additional source of influence on baptisteries, conveying the idea of reception or redemptive passage to salvation. Iconography of assembled figures and the throne of Christ would also relate to this.

Throne halls
Michele Melaragno writes that the concept of "Christ the King" was the Christian counterpoint to the Roman tradition of emperor deification and so absorbed the dome symbolism associated with it. E. Baldwin Smith writes that "[i]n the West during the Carolingian period the churchmen and rulers revived, or took over from the Byzantine East, the use of cupolas as a mark of royal and divine presence." Like the throne room of the Eastern Roman emperor, or Chrysotriklinos, Charlemagne's throne in the Palatine Chapel at Aachen was located in a domed octagonal space. In the words of Allan George Doig, the throne at Aachen was located in "an intermediary place between earth and heaven" on the gallery level, directly across from an image of Christ's throne on the dome. Winand Klassen writes that the domed space symbolized the dual secular and divine nature of the restored empire. According to Herbert Schutz, the symbolism of the octagon at Aachen related to the emperor's role as God's representative on Earth in achieving a universal "Imperium Christianum" and the geometry of objects and architecture acted as a "wordless text" to suggest ideas, such as the "renovatio imperii".

Churches

Middle Ages
Literary evidence exists that the idea of the cosmic temple had been applied to the Christian basilica by the end of the 4th century, in the form of a speech by Eusebius on a church in Tyre. However, it is only in the mid 6th century that the earliest literary evidence of a cosmological interpretation of a domed church building exists, in a hymn composed for the cathedral church of Edessa. Kathleen E. McVey traces this to a blending by Jacob of Serugh of the two major but contradictory schools of biblical exegesis at the time: the building-as-microcosm tradition of the Antioch school combined with the Alexandrian view of the cosmos and firmament as composed of spheres and hemispheres, which was rejected by the Antioch school. 

Gold was used as the color of Heaven, and Charles Stewart notes that the emphasis on light from windows beneath the domes of Justinian's imperial commissions corresponds to the Neo-Platonist idea of light as a symbol of wisdom. Andrzej Piotrowski writes that Byzantine churches after Justinian's Hagia Sophia often had gold-covered domes with a ring of windows and that gold, as "the most precious metal and the paradigm of purity, was a sign of light and divinity in the writings of St. Basil and Pseudo-Dionysius. It 'does not rust, decompose, or wear and can be beaten to the fineness of air. Gold was used to invoke the transcendental nature of the Incarnate Christ.'" 

Beginning in the late eighth century, portraits of Christ began to replace gold crosses at the centers of church domes, which Charles Stewart suggests may have been an over-correction in favor of images after the periods of Iconoclasm in the eighth and ninth centuries. One of the first was on the nave dome of Hagia Sophia in Thessaloniki, and this eventually developed into the bust image known as the Pantokrator. Otto Demus writes that Middle Byzantine churches were decorated in a systematic manner and can be seen as having three zones of decoration, with the holiest at the top. This uppermost zone contained the dome, drum and apse. The dome was reserved for the Pantokrator (meaning "ruler of all"), the drum usually contained images of angels or prophets, and the apse semi-dome usually depicted the Virgin Mary, typically holding the Christ Child and flanked by angels.

Anna Freze writes that the octagonal churches and octagon domed churches of the Byzantine Empire during the 9th to 11th centuries were closely linked to imperial commissions. The octagonal patterns were mean to convey "the idea of basilea as the sacral power and status of a Byzantine emperor" and the octagon, also being a symbol of regeneration, suggests an origin for this in the architectural restorations of Basil I following the iconoclast periods. 

Nicola Camerlenghi writes that domes were status symbols among the competing cities and communes of medieval Italy and this contributed to the boom in dome construction there beginning in the 11th century.

Renaissance
According to James Mitchell, in the Renaissance the dome began to be a symbol throughout Europe of the unity of religion. The astrological depiction of star constellations in the small dome above the altar of the Old Sacristy of the Basilica of San Lorenzo in Florence, has been calculated to represent July 6, 1439 at about noon, the date of the closing session of the Council of Florence, in which the Articles of Union between Eastern and Western Christendom were signed by Latin and Greek delegates. Nathaniel Curtis writes that the large domes of the Renaissance implied "ideas of power, dominance or centralization - as the capitol of a nation or of a state." He notes that Guadet said of St. Peter's, "it is less the roof of the greatest of all churches than the covering and sign of this centre to which converges the entire unity of Catholicism." Janna Israel writes that the adoption of Byzantine architectural forms in Venice at the end of the fifteenth century, such as low domes on pendentives, helped "in the construction of a more harmonious and seamless history between Venice and Byzantium, glossing over the divisions that had actually defined the relationship between the two powers for almost a thousand years." 

Centrally planned churches in Europe spread from the middle of the fifteenth century onward as part of the Renaissance. Rudolf Wittkower writes that many centralized domed churches dedicated to the Virgin Mary were meant to evoke the shape of a crown and her status as Queen of Heaven.

According to Linda Koch, it has been recognized that Renaissance humanism inspired a general revival of antiquity and attempted to reconcile Christianity with Roman paganism. Sylvie Duvernoy writes that the 1450 architectural treatise written by Leon Battista Alberti was inspired by Vitruvius' ancient book De architectura but written from a humanist perspective and, unlike Vitruvius, advocated for central plans because the circle was "the favourite shape of nature". Of the nine church designs provided in the book, six were circular or polygonal centrally planned designs, with the polygonal shapes recommended to be drawn with equal angles so that they can be inscribed in a circle. Irene Giustina writes that, in Renaissance Italy, the pointed dome was considered structurally safer but was also "against the rules of antique architecture". The pointed profile was considered barbarian and timburios were used as much to conceal the dome's shape externally as for structural reasons. Semicircular dome profiles were preferred.

Counter-Reformation
The appearance of the oval in architecture has been extensively discussed by architectural historians. Although not an idea originating in the Renaissance, by the beginning of the 1500s the idea of the oval was "in the air", according to Santiago Huerta. During the discussions of the Council of Trent (1545-1563), which began the Counter-Reformation of the Catholic Church in response to the Protestant Reformation, the circle and square were declared too pagan for Christian churches.  Although the council did not make any direct pronouncements regarding architecture and, according to Hanno-Walter Kruft, the effects of those reforms actually adopted by the Council were varied, the one known written example of the Council's resolutions being applied to architecture, Cardinal Charles Borromeo's Instructiones fabricae et supellectilis ecclesiasticae of 1577, "condemns the circular form as heathenish." The publication was addressed only to Borromeo's own diocese of Milan, but gained currency throughout Europe. According to Michael Earls, the oval dome reconciled the "long axis, favored by the liturgy of the counter-reformation and the central plan so beloved by the spatial idealists." 

Victoria Hammond writes that, in addition to the oval form's inherent appeal, its use in domes may have been influenced by the European Age of Exploration, as well as by the theory of the elliptical orbits of planets. Sylvie Duvernoy notes that, while Johannes Kepler was too young to have influenced the initial popularity of oval churches, the 1609 publication of his discovery of the elliptical motion of planets could have contributed to their persistence. Sylvie Duvernoy writes that the use of a circular plan dome and an oval plan dome in the twin domed churches built between 1662 and 1679 at the northern entrance to the city of Rome, Santa Maria dei Miracoli and Santa Maria in Montesanto, indicates that the two forms were then considered symbolically equivalent.

Michał Kurzej argues that the domed transept likely "became a distinguishing feature of Roman Catholic Church buildings" in the 16th century and that imitation of Italian architecture outside of Italy at this time indicated partiality towards Roman Catholicism over Protestantism. 

Wolfgang Born writes that, according to Walter Tunk, "The Bavarian type of the bulbous dome is said to have originated from a fusion between a pointed spire and a dome." Hans Schindler states that "the onion spire carried the prestige of well-known pilgrimage churches and allowed a new church to indicate its kinship with them".

Eastern Orthodoxy
Piotr Krasny writes that the "five domes crowning traditional Ruthenian Orthodox churches were believed to symbolise the Five Patriarchs, who according to Orthodox ecclesiology wielded equal power in the Church. In the 17th century the five domes were replaced by one, symbolizing the pope's primacy which was acknowledged by the Uniat Church."

Miecyzslaw Wallis writes: "In old Russian temples, one dome would symbolize Christ, three, the Trinity, five, Christ and the four evangelists, thirteen domes, Christ and the twelve apostles."

Islam

Royalty
According to Oleg Grabar, the domes of the Islamic world, which rejected Christian-style iconography, continued the other traditions. Muslim royalty built palatial pleasure domes in continuation of the Roman and Persian imperial models, although many have not survived, and domed mausolea from Merv to India developed the form. In the early centuries of Islam, domes were closely associated with royalty. A dome built in front of the mihrab of a mosque, for example, was at least initially meant to emphasize the place of a prince during royal ceremonies. Over time such domes became primarily focal points for decoration or the direction of prayer. The use of domes in mausolea can likewise reflect royal patronage or be seen as representing the honor and prestige that domes symbolized, rather than having any specific funerary meaning. 

The wide variety of dome forms in medieval Islam reflected dynastic, religious, and social differences as much as practical building considerations. According to E. Baldwin Smith, the form of brick melon domes in the Near East with corrugations on the exterior may have been an extension of an earlier tradition of such domes in wood from the palace architecture of Alexandria. Smith also suggests that the "sculptured baldachins and cupolas" of Mughal architecture were an adoption from Ottoman architecture via traveling artists, craftsmen, and architects from the Ottoman court.

Theology
Camilla Edwards writes that "the dome, and its decorative elements are fundamental to Islamic belief" and are often found in three structures that can serve as places of worship: mosques, madrasas, and mausolea. Doğan Kuban writes that even seemingly minor variations in shape, structure, and functional use had theoretical implications, and were the "result of complex and culturally significant developments in the Islamic world, where the dome and minaret became symbols of Islam." 

Oleg Grabar characterizes forms in Islamic architecture as having relatively low levels of symbolism. While conceding this in a general sense, Yasser Tabbaa maintains that certain forms were initially very highly symbolic and only lost such associations over time. The phenomenon of muqarnas domes, in particular, is an example. Tabbaa explains the development and spread of muqarnas domes throughout the Islamic world beginning in the early 11th century as the visual expression of a theological idea of the universe propounded by the Ash'arites (a modification of the Atomism of Aristotle with Occasionalism), which rose to prominence in Baghdad at this time. Only later was the style used in a purely decorative manner. 

Theresa Grupico writes that the use of the octagon in the Dome of the Rock, imperial funerary architecture, or mosque architecture may be a borrowing from earlier Byzantine or Persian use or reflect the idea of Paradise having "eight gardens with eight doors". Rina Avner writes that the building was designed to express the Muslim rejection of the Christian tenets of the divinity of Christ and the role of Mary as "God-bearer". Its octagonal shape likely references the octagonal Church of the Kathisma, an octagonal Christian shrine three miles away that was built around a stone said to have served as a seat for the Virgin Mary. The inner span of the Dome of the Rock is slightly wider that of the Church of the Kathisma. The dome of the Dome of the Rock has been compared to that of the nearby domed Church of the Anastasis. A 10th century source writes that the Dome of the Rock "was meant to compete with and surpass the churches of Jerusalem in beauty, especially with respect to the overwhelming size of the dome of the Anastasis."

Ottoman mosques, such as the Mosque of Suleyman the Great in Istanbul, have been interpreted as "challenging" the Hagia Sophia or "inviting similarities" of message beyond the merely visual. The use of Koranic text to decorate the pendentives of domes in the Islamic world replaced the human depictions of Christian iconography, such as the Four Evangelists, but similarly represented the way to the Word of God.

Government

Early modern legislatures
Thomas Markus writes that the dome became a symbol of democratic political power over the course of the eighteenth, nineteenth, and twentieth centuries. 

The Irish Parliament House in Dublin included an octagonal dome over a central chamber for the House of Commons. Edward McParland writes that the location of the space, especially relative to the barrel-vaulted House of Lords, which was off axis on the east side of the building, may have symbolized a political dominance by the House of Commons.

Kendall Wallis writes that the decision to build the national capitol building of the United States with a large dome "took a form laden with symbolic sacred meaning and ascribed a radically secular meaning to it." The decorative use of coffers is meant to evoke a connection with the classical origins of democracy and republicanism. "It represented the legislative power of the republic", sanctified. The ideas of religious association and sky symbolism also persisted in their resonance with the providential overtones of America's sense of its vocation in the world and, more pronounced in the state capitols, in the stars and sky scenes depicted on the domes. Those state capitol domes built after the American Civil War that resembled the second national capitol dome referred symbolically to the Federal government and so to the idea of "the Union". Charles Goodsell suggests a link between the function of a capitol as the "headquarters" of government, the root word of "capitol" being caput or "head", and the physical resemblance of a capitol dome to a great head.

Dictatorship
Both Hitler and Stalin planned, but never completed, enormous domed assembly halls as part of their efforts to establish global capital cities. Hitler's Volkshalle, or "People's Hall", was meant to have a dome 250 meters wide and hold 200,000 people. The Palace of the Soviets in Moscow was meant to be the tallest building in the world, rising above a domed congress hall 100 meters wide for 21,000 world socialist delegates. The foundations were begun for the Palace of the Soviets on the site of the demolished Cathedral of Christ the Saviour, but technical problems postponed the project and it was abandoned after Stalin's death in the 1950s. R. J. Overy writes that these were meant to be monuments to dictatorship and utopian civilization that would last for ages.

Modern legislatures
According to Giovanni Rizzoni, although the dome traditionally represented absolute power, the modern glass dome of the German Reichstag building expresses both the sovereignty of the people, who as tourists are literally above the legislature while touring the dome, and the accessibility of parliamentary democracy, due to the transparency of the glass dome and the window it provides into the legislative chamber below. William Seale writes that the dome is an accepted architectural symbol across the world for democratic legislatures.

Notes

References

Bibliography 

 
 
 
 
 
 
 
 
 
 
 
 
 
 
 
 
 
 
 
 
 
 
 
 
 
 
 
 
 
 
 
 
 
 
 
 
 
 
 
 
 
 
 
 
 
 
 
 
 
 
 
 
 
 
 
 
 
 
 
 

Dome
Sacral architecture
Symbolism